The Molong Express and Western District Advertiser is a newspaper published in Molong, New South Wales, Australia since 1876.

History
The Molong Express was first published on 1 October 1876 by Henry Vale Leathem and promoted the cause of free trade. Leathem continued to publish the Molong Express until he died in 1879, after which it was published by his widow, Marion Leathem, and his sons.

The Molong Express faced competition from The Molong Argus which was first published in 1895 which adopted a protectionist viewpoint.

The Leathems continued to publish  The Molong Express until 1933 when it was sold to Walter Pollard Stanger. Stanger also bought The Molong Argus in 1934 and shortly afterwards incorporated it into The Molong Express.

The Molong Express was owned by Norman Bloomfield from 1955 until his death in 2005.

The Express was purchased by Paul Mullins in 2006 and has been produced and published since then by Paul and his partner Rozzi Smith (Editor).

Digitisation
The paper has been digitised as part of the Australian Newspapers Digitisation Program project of the National Library of Australia.

See also
 List of newspapers in Australia
 List of newspapers in New South Wales

References

External links
 
 

Newspapers published in New South Wales
Newspapers on Trove